Kumiko Takahashi may refer to:

, Japanese writer
, Japanese animator and character designer
, Japanese singer